Whisky or whiskey is a type of distilled alcoholic beverage made from fermented grain mash. Various grains (which may be malted) are used for different varieties, including barley, corn, rye, and wheat. Whisky is typically aged in wooden casks, which are typically made of charred white oak. Uncharred white oak casks previously used for the aging of port, rum or sherry are also sometimes used.

Whisky is a strictly regulated spirit worldwide with many classes and types. The typical unifying characteristics of the different classes and types are the fermentation of grains, distillation, and aging in wooden barrels.

Etymology
This Gaelic word shares its ultimate origins with Germanic water and Slavic voda of the same meaning. Early forms of the word in English included uskebeaghe (1581), usquebaugh (1610), usquebath (1621), and usquebae (1715).

Names and spellings
Much is made of the word's two spellings: whisky and whiskey. There are two schools of thought on the issue. One is that the spelling difference is simply a matter of regional language convention for the spelling of a word, indicating that the spelling varies depending on the intended audience or the background or personal preferences of the writer (like the difference between color and colour; or recognize and recognise), and the other is that the spelling should depend on the style or origin of the spirit being described. There is general agreement that when quoting the proper name printed on a label, the spelling on the label should not be altered.

The spelling whiskey is common in Ireland and the United States, while whisky is used in all other whisky-producing countries. In the US, the usage has not always been consistent. From the late eighteenth century to the mid twentieth century, American writers used both spellings interchangeably until the introduction of newspaper style guides. Since the 1960s, American writers have increasingly used whiskey as the accepted spelling for aged grain spirits made in the US and whisky for aged grain spirits made outside the US. However, some prominent American brands, such as George Dickel, Maker's Mark, and Old Forester (all made by different companies), use the whisky spelling on their labels, and the Standards of Identity for Distilled Spirits, the legal regulations for spirit in the US, also use the whisky spelling throughout.

Scotch
Whisky made in Scotland is simply called whisky within Scotland, while elsewhere (and in the UK regulations that govern its production) it is commonly called Scotch whisky, or simply "Scotch" (especially in North America).

History

Early distilling 
It is possible that distillation was practised by the Babylonians in Mesopotamia in the 2nd millennium BC, with perfumes and aromatics being distilled, but this is subject to uncertain and disputed interpretations of evidence.

The earliest certain chemical distillations were by Greeks in Alexandria in the 1st century AD, but these were not distillations of alcohol.  The medieval Arabs adopted the distillation technique of the Alexandrian Greeks, and written records in Arabic begin in the 9th century, but again these were not distillations of alcohol. Distilling technology passed from the medieval Arabs to the medieval Latins, with the earliest records in Latin in the early 12th century.

The earliest records of the distillation of alcohol are in Italy in the 13th century, where alcohol was distilled from wine. An early description of the technique was given by Ramon Llull (1232–1315). Its use spread through medieval monasteries, largely for medicinal purposes, such as the treatment of colic and smallpox.

Ireland and Scotland 
The art of distillation spread to Ireland and Scotland no later than the 15th century, as did the common European practice of distilling "aqua vitae", spirit alcohol, primarily for medicinal purposes. The practice of medicinal distillation eventually passed from a monastic setting to the secular via professional medical practitioners of the time, The Guild of Barber Surgeons. The earliest mention of whisky in Ireland comes from the seventeenth-century Annals of Clonmacnoise, which attributes the death of a chieftain in 1405 to "taking a surfeit of aqua vitae" at Christmas. In Scotland, the first evidence of whisky production comes from an entry in the Exchequer Rolls for 1495 where malt is sent "To Friar John Cor, by order of the king, to make aquavitae", enough to make about 500 bottles.

James IV of Scotland (r. 1488–1513) reportedly had a great liking for Scotch whisky, and in 1506 the town of Dundee purchased a large amount of whisky from the Guild of Barber-Surgeons, which held the monopoly on production at the time. Between 1536 and 1541, King Henry VIII of England dissolved the monasteries, sending their monks out into the general public. Whisky production moved out of a monastic setting and into personal homes and farms as newly independent monks needed to find a way to earn money for themselves.

The distillation process was still in its infancy; whisky itself was not allowed to age, and as a result tasted very raw and brutal compared to today's versions. Renaissance-era whisky was also very potent and not diluted. Over time whisky evolved into a much smoother drink.

With a royal licence to distil Irish whiskey from 1608, the Old Bushmills Distillery in Northern Ireland is the oldest licensed whiskey distillery in the world.

18th century 
In 1707, the Acts of Union merged England and Scotland, and thereafter taxes on it rose dramatically. Following parliament's divisive malt tax of 1725, most of Scotland's distillation was either shut down or forced underground. Scotch whisky was hidden under altars, in coffins, and in any available space to avoid the governmental excisemen or revenuers. Scottish distillers, operating out of homemade stills, took to distilling whisky at night when the darkness hid the smoke from the stills. For this reason, the drink became known as moonshine. At one point, it was estimated that over half of Scotland's whisky output was illegal.

In America, whisky was used as currency during the American Revolution; George Washington operated a large distillery at Mount Vernon. Given the distances and primitive transportation network of colonial America, farmers often found it easier and more profitable to convert corn to whisky and transport it to market in that form. It also was a highly coveted sundry and when an additional excise tax was levied against it in 1791, the Whiskey Rebellion erupted.

19th century 

The drinking of Scotch whisky was introduced to India in the nineteenth century. The first distillery in India was built by Edward Dyer at Kasauli in the late 1820s. The operation was soon shifted to nearby Solan (close to the British summer capital Shimla), as there was an abundant supply of fresh spring water there.

In 1823, the UK passed the Excise Act, legalizing the distillation (for a fee), and this put a practical end to the large-scale production of Scottish moonshine.

In 1831, Aeneas Coffey patented the Coffey still, allowing for a cheaper and more efficient distillation of whisky. In 1850, Andrew Usher began producing a blended whisky that mixed traditional pot still whisky with that from the new Coffey still. The new distillation method was scoffed at by some Irish distillers, who clung to their traditional pot stills. Many Irish contended that the new product was, in fact, not whisky at all.

By the 1880s, the French brandy industry was devastated by the phylloxera pest that ruined much of the grape crop; as a result, whisky became the primary liquor in many markets.

20th century 

During the Prohibition era in the United States lasting from 1920 to 1933, all alcohol sales were banned in the country. The federal government made an exemption for whisky prescribed by a doctor and sold through licensed pharmacies. During this time, the Walgreens pharmacy chain grew from 20 retail stores to almost 400.

Production

Distillation
A still for making whisky is usually made of copper, since it removes sulfur-based compounds from the alcohol that would make it unpleasant to drink.  Modern stills are made of stainless steel with copper innards (piping, for example, will be lined with copper along with copper plate inlays along still walls). The simplest standard distillation apparatus is commonly known as a pot still, consisting of a single heated chamber and a vessel to collect purified alcohol.

Column stills are frequently used in the production of grain whisky and are the most commonly used type of still in the production of bourbon and other American whiskeys. Column stills behave like a series of single pot stills, formed in a long vertical tube. Whereas a single pot still charged with wine might yield a vapour enriched to 40–60% alcohol, a column still can achieve a vapour alcohol content of 95.6%; an azeotropic mixture of alcohol and water.

Aging
Whiskies do not mature in the bottle, only in the cask, so the "age" of a whisky is only the time between distillation and bottling. This reflects how much the cask has interacted with the whisky, changing its chemical makeup and taste. Whiskies that have been bottled for many years may have a rarity value, but are not "older" and not necessarily "better" than a more recent whisky that matured in wood for a similar time. After a decade or two, additional aging in a barrel does not necessarily improve a whisky.

While aging in wooden casks, especially American oak and French oak casks, whisky undergoes six processes that contribute to its final flavour: extraction, evaporation, oxidation, concentration, filtration, and colouration. Extraction in particular results in whisky acquiring a number of compounds, including aldehydes and acids such as vanillin, vanillic acid, and syringaldehyde. The casks used for aging bourbon whiskey are required to be new (and charred); after being used for this purpose, these casks are typically exported for use in the aging of other whiskies elsewhere. Distillers will sometimes age their whiskey in barrels previously used to age other spirits, such as port, rum or sherry, to impart particular flavours.

Packaging
Most whiskies are sold at or near an alcoholic strength of 40% abv, which is the statutory minimum in some countries – although the strength can vary, and cask-strength whisky may have as much as twice that alcohol percentage.

Exports
Whisky is probably the best known of Scotland's manufactured products. Exports have increased by 87% in the decade to 2012 and it contributes over £4.25 billion to the UK economy, making up a quarter of all its food and drink revenues. In 2012, the US was the largest market for Scotch whisky (£655 million), followed by France (£535 million). It is also one of the UK's overall top five manufacturing export earners and it supports around 35,000 jobs. Principal whisky producing areas include Speyside and the Isle of Islay, where there are nine distilleries providing a major source of employment. In many places, the industry is closely linked to tourism, with many distilleries also functioning as attractions worth £30 million GVA each year.

In 2011, 70% of Canadian whisky was exported, with about 60% going to the US, and the rest mostly to Europe and Asia. 15 million cases of Canadian whisky were sold in the US in 2011.

Types

Whisky or whisky-like products are produced in most grain-growing areas. They differ in base product, alcoholic content, and quality.

 Malt whisky – made primarily from malted barley
 Grain whisky – made from any type of grain

Malts and grains are combined in various ways:

 Single malt whisky is whisky from a single distillery made from a mash that uses only one particular malted grain. Unless the whisky is described as single-cask, it contains whisky from many casks, and different years, so the blender can achieve a taste recognisable as typical of the distillery. In most cases, single malts bear the name of the distillery, with an age statement and perhaps some indication of some special treatments, such as maturation in a port wine cask.
 Blended malt whisky is a mixture of single malt whiskies from different distilleries. If whisky is labelled "pure malt" or just "malt" it is almost certainly a blended malt whisky. This was formerly called a "vatted malt" whisky.
 Blended whisky is made from a mixture of different types of whisky. A blend may contain whisky from many distilleries so that the blender can produce a flavour consistent with the brand. The brand name may, therefore, omit the name of a distillery. Most Scotch, Irish and Canadian whisky is sold as part of a blend, even when the spirits are the product of one distillery, as is common in Canada. American blended whisky may contain neutral spirits.
 Cask strength (also known as barrel proof) whiskies are rare, and usually, only the very best whiskies are bottled in this way. They are bottled from the cask undiluted or only lightly diluted.
 Single cask (also known as single barrel) whiskies are bottled from an individual cask, and often the bottles are labelled with specific barrel and bottle numbers. The taste of these whiskies may vary substantially from cask to cask within a brand.

National varieties

American

American whiskey is distilled from a fermented mash of cereal grain. It must have the taste, aroma, and other characteristics commonly attributed to whiskey.

Some types of whiskey listed in the United States federal regulations are:
 Bourbon whiskey: made from mash that consists of at least 51% corn (maize) and aged in new charred oak barrels.
 Corn whiskey: made from mash that consists of at least 80% corn and is not aged, or, if aged, is aged in uncharred or used barrels. 
 Malt whiskey: made from mash that consists of at least 51% malted barley
 Rye whiskey: made from mash that consists of at least 51% rye
 Rye malt whiskey: made from mash that consists of at least 51% malted rye
 Wheat whiskey: made from mash that consists of at least 51% wheat

These types of American whiskey must be distilled to no more than 80% alcohol by volume, and barrelled at no more than 125 proof. Only water may be added to the final product; the addition of colouring or flavouring is prohibited. These whiskeys must be aged in new charred-oak containers, except for corn whiskey, which does not have to be aged. If it is aged, it must be in uncharred oak barrels or in used barrels. Corn whiskey is usually unaged and sold as a legal version of moonshine.

There is no minimum aging period required for a spirit to legally be called whiskey. If one of these whiskey types reaches two years aging or beyond, it is additionally designated as straight, e.g., straight rye whiskey. A whiskey that fulfils all above requirements but derives from less than 51% of any one specific grain can be called simply a straight whiskey without naming a grain.

US regulations recognize other whiskey categories, including:

 Blended whiskey: a mixture that contains a blend of straight whiskeys and neutral grain spirits (NGS), and may also contain flavourings and colourings. The percentage of NGS must be disclosed on the label and may be as much at 80% on a proof gallon basis.
 Light whiskey: produced in the US at more than 80% alcohol by volume and stored in used or uncharred new oak containers
 Spirit whiskey: a mixture of neutral spirits and at least 5% of certain stricter categories of whiskey

Another important labelling in the marketplace is Tennessee whiskey, which includes brands such as Jack Daniel's, George Dickel, Collier and McKeel, and Benjamin Prichard's. The main difference defining a Tennessee whiskey is that it must be filtered through sugar maple charcoal before aging, known as the Lincoln County Process. (Benjamin Prichard's, which is not so filtered, was grandfathered in when the requirement was introduced in 2017.) The rest of the distillation process of Tennessee Whiskey is identical to bourbon whiskey. Whiskey sold as "Tennessee whiskey" is defined as bourbon under NAFTA and at least one other international trade agreement, and is similarly required to meet the legal definition of bourbon under Canadian law.

Australian

Australian whiskies have won global whisky awards and medals, including the World Whiskies Awards and Jim Murray's Whisky Bible "Liquid Gold Awards".

Canadian

The terms "Canadian Whisky", "Rye Whisky", and "Canadian Rye Whisky" are legally indistinguishable in Canada and do not require any specific grain in their production and are often blends of two or more grains. Canadian whiskies may contain caramel and flavouring in addition to the distilled mash spirits, and there is no maximum limit on the alcohol level of the distillation. The minimum bottling proof is 40% ABV. To be exported under one of the "Canadian Whisky" designations, a whisky cannot contain more than 9.09% imported spirits.

Canadian whiskies are available throughout the world and are a culturally significant export. Well known brands include Crown Royal, Canadian Club, Seagram's, and Wiser's among others. The historic popularity of Canadian whisky in the United States is partly a result of rum runners illegally importing it into the country during the period of American Prohibition.

Danish
Denmark began producing whisky early in 1974. The first Danish single malt to go on sale was Lille Gadegård from Bornholm, in 2005. Lille Gadegård is a winery as well, and uses its own wine casks to mature whisky.

The second Danish distilled single malt whisky for sale was Edition No.1 from the Braunstein microbrewery and distillery. It was distilled in 2007, using water from the Greenlandic ice sheet, and entered the market in March 2010.

Another distillery is Stauning Whisky, based in Jutland.

Nyborg Destilleri, from the island Funen (Fyn) in the center of Denmark, produces organic whisky and other organic spirits. The distillery was established in 2009, and in 2020 they launched their first 10 year old whisky.

English

There are currently at least eight distilleries producing English whisky. Distillers operated in London, Liverpool, and Bristol until the late 19th century, after which production of English single malt whisky ceased until 2003.

Finnish

In 2005, there were two working distilleries in Finland and a third one under construction. Whisky retail sales in Finland are controlled solely by the state alcohol monopoly Alko and advertising of strong alcoholic beverages is banned.

French

French whisky is whisky produced in France. The distilleries producing French whisky include Glann ar Mor and Warenghem in Brittany, Guillon in the Champagne region, and Grallet-Dupic in Lorraine. Buckwheat whisky is produced by Distillerie des Menhirs in Plomelin, Brittany.  There are over 40 whisky distilleries currently operating or opening in France. 

The first French whisky was produced at Warenghem distillery in 1987, who then introduced the first single malt French whisky in 1998.

According to a study in 2016, the French are the largest consumers of whisky in the world, especially Scotch.

Georgia
The first Georgian whisky has been made by Georgian wine-maker, co-founder of "Askaneli Brothers", Jimsher Chkhaidze. JIMSHER whisky is made by traditional Scottish method and is presented from 2016. On the bottle and tag design worked Georgian product designer Zviad Tsikolia.

New Georgian blended whisky is presented with three varieties, such are:
Aged in Georgian ex-wine "Saperavi" oak cask;
Aged in Georgian ex-wine "Tsinandali" oak cask;
Aged in ex-Georgian Brandy oak cask;
Georgian whisky is available on markets such as China, Poland, Ukraine and Kazakhstan.
In 2017 on "World Whiskey Masters" degustation contest which happened in London, Georgian whisky got silver medal in different categories. On the same year Georgian whisky was rewarded with its first gold medal and silver medals on the contest "Global Travel Retail Spirits Masters".
In March 2018 JIMSHER got rewarded by silver medal in "Best World Whisky" category by "International Whisky Competition".

German

German whisky production is a relatively recent phenomenon having only started in the early 1990s. The styles produced resemble those made in Ireland, Scotland and the United States: single malts, blends, wheat, and bourbon-like styles. There is no standard spelling of German whiskies with distilleries using both "whisky" and "whiskey". In 2008 there were 23 distilleries in Germany producing whisky.

Indian

Distilled alcoholic beverages that are labelled as "whisky" in India were commonly blends based on neutral spirits that are distilled from fermented molasses/grain with only a small portion consisting of traditional malt whisky, usually about 10 to 12 percent. Outside India, such a drink would more likely be labelled a rum. According to the Scotch Whisky Association's 2013 annual report, "there is no compulsory definition of whisky in India, and the Indian voluntary standard does not require whisky to be distilled from cereals or to be matured." Molasses-based blends made up 90 percent of the spirits consumed as "whisky" in India, although whisky wholly distilled from malt and other grains is also produced. By 2004 shortages of wheat had been overcome and India was one of the largest producers. Amrut, the first single malt whisky produced in India, was launched in Glasgow, Scotland in 2004. After expanding in Europe it was launched in India in 2010.

By 2022 India produced many whiskies both for the local market—the most lucrative market for whisky  in the world—and export. Indian single malts comprised 15% of the local market in 2017, increasing to 33% in 2022. In the three years to 2022 sales of Indian malts increased by an annual average of 42%, compared with 7% for imported rivals.

Irish

Irish whiskeys are normally distilled three times, Cooley Distillery being the exception as they also double distil. Though traditionally distilled using pot stills, the column still is now used to produce grain whiskey for blends. By law, Irish whiskey must be produced in Ireland and aged in wooden casks for a period of no less than three years, although in practice it is usually three or four times that period. Unpeated malt is almost always used, the main exception being Connemara Peated Malt whiskey. There are several types of whiskey common to Ireland: single malt, single grain, blended whiskey and single pot still whiskey.

Irish whiskey was once the most popular spirit in the world, though a long period of decline from the late 19th century to the late 20th century greatly damaged the industry, so much so that, although Ireland boasted over 30 distilleries in the 1890s, a century later this number had fallen to just three. However, Irish whiskey has seen a great resurgence in popularity since the late twentieth century, and has been the fastest growing spirit in the world every year since 1990. With exports growing by over 15% per annum in recent years, existing distilleries have been expanded and a number of new distilleries constructed. As of mid 2019, Ireland now has twenty-five distilleries in operation, with twenty-four more in either planned or under development. However, many of these have not been operating long enough to have products sufficiently aged for sale, and only one of which was operating prior to 1975.

Japanese

Japan produces both single malt and blended whiskies. The base is a mash of malted barley, dried in kilns fired with a little peat (although less than what is used for some peated Scotch whiskies), and is distilled using the pot still method. Before 2000, Japanese whisky was primarily for the domestic market and exports were limited. In recent years, though, Japanese whisky has grown in popularity on the global market. Japanese whiskies such as Suntory and Nikka won many prestigious international awards between 2007 and 2014. Japanese whisky has earned a reputation for quality.

Mexican

Mexican whisky is relatively young as it has not been as popular in the country as other distilled drinks but recently many distillers in the country have started to make a push to create homegrown whisky and make it as popular as whisky from other countries.

Scotch 

Whisky made in Scotland is known as Scotch whisky, or simply as "Scotch" (especially in North America).

Scotch whiskies are generally distilled twice, although some are distilled a third time and others even up to twenty times. Scotch Whisky Regulations require anything bearing the label "Scotch" to be distilled in Scotland and matured for a minimum of three years in oak casks, among other, more specific criteria. Any age statement on the bottle, in the form of a number, must reflect the age of the youngest Scotch whisky used to produce that product. A whisky with an age statement is known as guaranteed age whisky. Scotch whisky without an age statement may, by law, be as young as three years old.

The basic types of Scotch are malt and grain, which are combined to create blends. Scotch malt whiskies were divided into five main regions: Highland, Lowland, Islay, Speyside and Campbeltown. Each of the whisky producing regions has a distinct flavour profile and characteristics to the whisky they produce.

There is also a sixth region recognized by some sources, though not by the Scotch Whisky Association, The Islands, excluding Islay. This unofficial region, (part of the Highlands according to the Association), includes the following whisky-producing islands making Island single malt: Arran, Jura, Mull, Orkney, and Skye.

Swedish
Whisky started being produced in Sweden in 1955 by the now defunct Skeppets whisky brand. Their last bottle was sold in 1971. In 1999 Mackmyra Whisky was founded and is today the largest producer and has won several awards including European Whisky of the Year in Jim Murray's 2011 Whisky Bible and the International Wine & Spirits Competition (IWSC) 2012 Award for Best European Spirits Producer of 2012.

Taiwanese

Kavalan was the first private whisky distillery in Taiwan. In January 2010, one of the distillery's products caused a stir by beating three Scotch whiskies and one English whisky in a blind tasting organised in Leith, Scotland, to celebrate Burns Night.[4] [5] The distillery was named by Whisky Magazine as the World Icons of Whisky "Whisky Visitor Attraction of the Year" for 2011, and its products have won several other awards.[3] In 2012, Kavalan's  Fino Sherry Cask malt whisky was named "new whisky of the year" by Jim Murray in his guide, Jim Murray's Whisky Bible.[6] In 2015, Kavalan's  Vinho Barrique Single Cask was named the world's best single malt whisky by World Whiskies Awards.[7] [8] In 2016, Kavalan  Amontillado Sherry Single Cask was named the world's best single malt whisky by World Whisky Awards.

Welsh

Although distillation of whisky in Wales began in Middle Ages there were no commercially operated distilleries during the 20th century. The rise of the temperance movement saw the decline of the commercial production of liquor during the 19th century and in 1894 Welsh whisky production ceased. The revival of Welsh whisky began in the 1990s.  Initially a "Prince of Wales" malt whisky was sold as Welsh whisky but was simply blended scotch bottled in Wales. A lawsuit by Scotch distillers ended this enterprise. In 2000, Penderyn Distillery started production of Penderyn single malt whisky. The first bottles went on sale on 1 March 2004, Saint David's Day, and it is now sold worldwide. Penderyn Distillery is located in the Brecon Beacons National Park and is considered to be the smallest distillery in the world.

Other
ManX Spirit from the Isle of Man is distilled elsewhere and re-distilled in the country of its nominal "origin". The ManX distillery takes a previously matured Scotch malt whisky and re-distils it.

Frysk Hynder is a Frisian single malt, distilled and bottled in the Us Heit Distillery. It is the first single malt produced in Friesland, Netherlands.

In 2008 at least two distilleries in the traditionally brandy-producing Caucasus region announced their plans to enter the Russian domestic market with whiskies. The Stavropol-based Praskoveysky distillery bases its product on Irish whiskey, while in Kizlyar, Dagestan's "Russian Whisky" announced a Scotch-inspired drink in single malt, blended and wheat varieties.

In 2010 a Czech whisky was released, the 21-year-old "Hammer Head".

Puni is an Italian distillery in Glurns that makes single malt whisky, including Alba, which is matured in Marsala casks.

Destilerías y Crianza del Whisky S.A. is a whisky distillery in Spain. Its eight-year-old Whisky DYC is a combination of malts and spirits distilled from barley aged separately a minimum of eight years in American oak barrels.

Chemistry

Overview
Whiskies and other distilled beverages, such as cognac and rum, are complex beverages that contain a vast range of flavouring compounds, of which some 200 to 300 are easily detected by chemical analysis. The flavouring chemicals include "carbonyl compounds, alcohols, carboxylic acids and their esters, nitrogen- and sulfur-containing compounds, tannins, and other polyphenolic compounds, terpenes, and oxygen-containing, heterocyclic compounds" and esters of fatty acids. The nitrogen compounds include pyridines, picolines and pyrazines. The sulfur compounds include thiophenes and polysulfides which seem to contribute to whiskey's roasted character.

Flavours from treating the malt
The distinctive smoky flavour found in various types of whisky, especially Scotch, is due to the use of peat smoke to treat the malt.

Flavours from distillation
The flavouring of whisky is partially determined by the presence of congeners and fusel oils. Fusel oils are higher alcohols than ethanol, are mildly toxic, and have a strong, disagreeable smell and taste. An excess of fusel oils in whisky is considered a defect. A variety of methods are employed in the distillation process to remove unwanted fusel oils.  Traditionally, American distillers focused on secondary filtration using charcoal, gravel, sand, or linen to remove undesired distillates.

Acetals are rapidly formed in distillates and a great many are found in distilled beverages, the most prominent being acetaldehyde diethyl acetal (1,1-diethoxyethane). Among whiskies the highest levels are associated with malt whisky. This acetal is a principal flavour compound in sherry, and contributes fruitiness to the aroma.

The diketone diacetyl (2,3-butanedione) has a buttery aroma and is present in almost all distilled beverages. Whiskies and cognacs typically contain more of this than vodkas, but significantly less than rums or brandies.

Polysulfides and thiophenes enter whiskey through the distillation process and contribute to its roasted flavour.

Flavours from oak

Whisky that has been aged in oak barrels absorbs substances from the wood. One of these is cis-3-methyl-4-octanolide, known as the "whisky lactone" or "quercus lactone", a compound with a strong coconut aroma.

Commercially charred oaks are rich in phenolic compounds. One study identified 40 different phenolic compounds. The coumarin scopoletin is present in whisky, with the highest level reported in Bourbon whiskey.

In an experiment, whiskey aged 3 years in orbit on the International Space Station tasted and measured significantly different from similar test subjects in gravity on Earth. Particularly, wood extractives were more present in the space samples.

Flavours and colouring from additives
Depending on the local regulations, additional flavourings and colouring compounds may be added to the whisky. Canadian whisky may contain caramel and flavouring in addition to the distilled mash spirits. Scotch whisky may contain added (E150A) caramel colouring, but no other additives. The addition of flavourings is not allowed in American "straight" whiskey, but is allowed in American blends.

Chill filtration
Whisky is often "chill filtered": chilled to precipitate out fatty acid esters and then filtered to remove them. Most whiskies are bottled this way, unless specified as unchillfiltered or non-chill filtered. This is done primarily for cosmetic reasons. Unchillfiltered whiskies often turn cloudy when stored at cool temperatures or when cool water is added to them, and this is perfectly normal.

See also
 Outline of whisky
 List of cocktails#Whisky
 List of whisky brands
 Poitín

References

Further reading

External links 

 
Distilled drinks